NGC 2626 is a reflection nebula, emission nebula, and absorption nebula in the constellation Vela. It is mostly illuminated by B1 star CD-40 4432 and ionized by the O8 quadruple star system HD 73882, together with other stars.

Gallery

See also
 H II Region
 Star Formation

References

External links
 

H II regions
Open clusters
2626
Vela (constellation)
Star-forming regions